Paul McCallum (born January 7, 1970) is a former Canadian football punter and placekicker. McCallum had been a member of four different CFL franchises, one XFL team, an NFL Europa team, and a Scottish third division club. At the time of his retirement, McCallum was the oldest active player in the CFL, having played in 23 seasons over the course of his career.

Junior career 
McCallum played junior football with the Surrey Rams of the Canadian Junior Football League. He was a member of the BC Junior Football League Champion Surrey Rams who faced the Ottawa Sooners at Lansdowne Park in Ottawa for the Canadian Junior Football League Canadian Bowl Championship, losing 35-18.

Professional career

Soccer 
After a long youth soccer career in North Vancouver, Surrey, and Delta, BC, McCallum went on to play for Team BC at the Canada Summer Games as well as national tournaments with the BC Provincial program U16 (1985) and U18 (1986–1987). He also suited up briefly for the Vancouver 86ers for a preseason tournament (while in Grade 12 at Surrey BC's Queen Elizabeth Sr Sec.) in Kelowna, BC, and scored for the club there. McCallum travelled to Scotland at 19 years of age to play professional soccer in the Scottish Third Division for clubs St. Mirren and Hamilton Academicals. His cousin, Brian O'Neill, was also a professional soccer player for Celtic FC, Wolfsburg, Derby County, Preston North End, Nottingham Forest, and Aberdeen FC. Upon his return from the UK, McCallum started playing for the Surrey Rams Junior Football Club of the BC Junior Football League.

Early CFL career 
In 1993, after playing soccer in Scotland he returned to Canada and began playing for the Surrey Rams Junior Football Club in the BC Junior Football League. McCallum petitioned the CFL to allow Canadian Junior players to have the ability to attend their evaluation camp. He was successful and was ultimately added to the Negotiations List of the Hamilton Tiger Cats by Director of Player Personnel, Greg Mohns and subsequently signed as a free agent with the CFL's Hamilton Tiger-Cats. After being released, he had numerous short stints with the Ottawa Rough Riders, (1992–1993) during his time there he was a teammate of former NFL Washington Football Club Dexter Manley and former WWE wrestler Glenn Kulka, BC Lions (1993,1994, 2006–2014, 2016) and Saskatchewan Roughriders (1994-1995, 1996–2005, 2015).

Scottish Claymores 
McCallum once again travelled to Scotland to play professional sports, this time as the punter and placekicker for the Scottish Claymores of the World League, and was with the team when they won World Bowl 1996 at Murrayfield Stadium Sunday, June 23 where they beat the defending champions, Frankfurt Galaxy 32-27 in front of 38,982 fans. Other notable players on the Claymores roster included former Denver Broncos wide receiver Yo Murphy, former NFL quarterback Jim Ballard, as well as Scotland Rugby Union legend Gavin Hastings OBE.

Saskatchewan Roughriders 
Prior to his spell in NFL Europe (1996) with the Scottish Claymores McCallum had been playing with the Riders, upon his return to Canada he resigned  with the Saskatchewan Roughriders and tore his ACL early in the  into the CFL season. After recovering he returned to play for the club until 2000 at which time he left to sign with the Las Vegas Outlaws of the XFL for their 2001 football season.

Las Vegas Outlaws 
McCallum was the Las Vegas Outlaws' kicker during the XFL's only season in 2001, scoring the first ever points in XFL history with a 25-yard field goal against the New York/New Jersey Hitmen.

Saskatchewan Roughriders (II) 
After the XFL folded after its inaugural season McCallum returned to the Saskatchewan Roughriders. McCallum set a CFL record for the longest field goal kicked in the CFL when he booted a wind-aided 62-yard field goal against the Edmonton Eskimos on October 27, 2001 in a 12-3 victory at Taylor Field.

In the 2004 CFL playoffs, McCallum missed a crucial 18-yard field goal in an overtime game against the BC Lions. The Roughriders went on to lose the game, and outraged fans vandalized McCallum's northwest Regina home with eggs, dumped manure on his neighbour's property, and uttered death threats to his family. The incident made national news, and the football club and Regina's mayor Pat Fiacco both denounced the vandalism as an "isolated incident" of "hooliganism". On the comedy show This Hour Has 22 Minutes, Shaun Majumder (playing a Roughriders GM) apologized for calling McCallum "a bum who could be out-kicked by a goat missing a leg".

BC Lions (III) 
On February 23, 2006, he signed a two-year contract with the BC Lions after declining to take a 30% pay-cut from the Roughriders.

He tied the record for most field goals in a Grey Cup when he kicked six in six attempts in the 94th Grey Cup on November 19, 2006. He was awarded the Dick Suderman Trophy as the Grey Cup's most valuable Canadian for his efforts.

In 2010, McCallum set a number of career marks. Continuing from the 14 consecutive field goals he made at the end of the 2009 season, McCallum connected on 10 straight to start the season, finishing just short of Dave Ridgway's CFL record of 28 straight field goals. Throughout the season he was flirting with Lui Passaglia's record for most accurate season (90.9%), and finished with a career best 88.2% completion percentage. He also finished the regular season with a career high 46 successful field goals. Because of his standout season, McCallum was named the Lions' nominee for Most Outstanding Player, the first ever kicker in Lions' history, and Most Outstanding Canadian.

On October 8, 2011 at BC Place in Vancouver, Paul set the record, with 30, for the most all-time consecutive field goals made in the CFL, breaking the previous mark of 28 held by Dave Ridgway. Only two seasons later, his record was broken by Calgary's Rene Paredes who connected on his 31st consecutive field goal on July 26, 2013. Paul McCallum would finish the 2011 CFL season making 50 of 53 field goal attempts, for a career best 94.3% accuracy. He was recognized for his success when he was named the CFL's Most Outstanding Special Teams player for 2011.

Following up his career season with another solid season in the 2012 CFL season. He amassed 44 successful field goals in 52 attempts (84.6%). The 2012 season was McCallum's 20th year in the CFL and 7th year with the BC Lions. He is one of only 5 players to have played 20 or more years in the CFL. During the 2013 CFL season McCallum saw a reduced number of field goal attempts, only 33, of which he converted on 28.

In February 2014 McCallum signed a contract extension with the BC Lions. In 2014 he had his best field goal kicking season since 2011, converting 38 of 42 attempts (90.5%). His 90.5% success rate was not only league leading, but also only his second time in his career of with a conversion percentage in the 90's. His role as a punter was heavily diminished in 2014, as he only performed 12 punts for the Lions in the season. On March 23, 2015, the Lions announced that McCallum would be returning for his 23rd season in the CFL. On June 6, 2015, McCallum, age 45, was released by the Lions after refusing to retire.

"McCallum had made 75.1 per cent of his field-goal attempts (356 of 474) through the 2005 season. Subsequently, he was 11 percentage points higher (86.3), going 366-for-424." Rob Vanstone Sports Editor Regina Leader-Post

Saskatchewan Roughriders (III) 
On July 1, 2015, McCallum signed with the Saskatchewan Roughriders. He played in 14 games, making 29 of 36 field goal attempts before being deactivated for the final three games of the season in favour of Tyler Crapigna. McCallum was released on December 21, 2015.

BC Lions (IV) 
On March 7, 2016, McCallum signed a one-day contract to retire as a member of the BC Lions. He remained retired for about eight months before re-signing with the BC Lions prior to the last game of the 2016 regular season.

McCallum was announced as a member of the Canadian Football Hall of Fame 2022 class on June 21, 2022.

Notoriety

CFL 
 He holds the CFL record for longest field goal made at 62 yards
 Has the second-highest field goal kicking accuracy in a single season at 94.34%.
 4th most games played in CFL history
 2nd most field goals scored in a CFL career (behind only Lui Passaglia)
 Top 10 most accurate kicker over a CFL career (minimum of 100 attempts)
 3rd longest consecutive successful field goal attempts with 30 in 2011.
 The only player in CFL history to play against the Ottawa Rough Riders, the Ottawa Renegades and the Ottawa RedBlacks. McCallum was also the last active player to have played for the Ottawa Rough Riders, with that franchise folding in 1996.
 The last active player to have played against an American-based CFL team
 Longest Kickoff in BC Lions history, (1994) 100 yards 
 Tied Grey Cup Record for Field Goals in a game, going 6 for 6 versus the Montreal Alouettes in the 2006 Championship game.
 CFL Records: Most Converts consecutively All Time

Other 
 Last active player to have played in the 2001 version of the XFL.
 Scored the first ever points in XFL history with a 25-yard field goal against the New York/New Jersey Hitmen.
 Sport BC, Community Champion Award winner 2012

References

External links 
 BC Lions bio 
 Saskatchewan Roughriders bio

1970 births
Living people
American football punters
American football placekickers
BC Lions players
Businesspeople from Vancouver
Canadian football placekickers
Canadian football punters
Canadian Junior Football League players
Canadian people of Scottish descent
Canadian players of American football
Canadian real estate businesspeople
Las Vegas Outlaws (XFL) players
Ottawa Rough Riders players
Players of Canadian football from British Columbia
Saskatchewan Roughriders players
Scottish Claymores players
Sportspeople from Vancouver
Gridiron football people from British Columbia
Canadian expatriate sportspeople in Scotland